The Northwest Territories Liquor and Cannabis Commission regulates the distribution, purchase and sale of alcoholic beverages in the Northwest Territories.

The Commission came into existence as a result of amendments to the Liquor Act. It currently has contracts with local operators for the operation of seven liquor stores and one warehouse.

The liquor commission enforces limits placed by the communities of Fort Simpson on liquor sales.

Operations in Nunavut were transferred to the Nunavut Liquor Commission, based in Rankin Inlet, in 2005.

External links
 Liquor restrictions in the Northwest Territories
 NWT Liquor Act

Companies established in 1983
Canadian provincial alcohol departments and agencies
Companies based in the Northwest Territories
Alcohol monopolies
Alcohol distribution retailers of Canada